Central Hospital may refer to:

 Ayrshire Central Hospital, also known as Irvine Central Hospital, an NHS hospital in Irvine, North Ayrshire, Scotland
 Central Hospital, Hatton, was a psychiatric hospital (closed 1995) located in Hatton, Warwickshire
 Central Mental Hospital, mental health facility housing forensic patients in Dublin, Ireland
 Central Middlesex Hospital, a teaching hospital of Imperial College London
 Helsinki University Central Hospital, the largest university hospital in Finland
 Hong Kong Central Hospital, closed in 2012
 Hospital Central (or Central Hospital), a Spanish television series
 Tampere University Hospital, the central hospital of Pirkanmaa region and one of the main hospitals in Finland
 York Central Hospital, a major hospital in Richmond Hill, Ontario

See also 
 Central State Hospital (disambiguation)